Brachystomatinae is a subfamily of flies belonging to the family Empididae.

Taxonomy
Until 2006, Brachystomatinae was classified as a subfamily within Empididae, at which point a new phylogeny was proposed in which the lineage was raised to family rank, though other contemporaneous studies did not support this conclusion, and in 2018 a new analysis indicated that the treatment of Brachystomatinae as a family rendered Empididae paraphyletic, and restored it to the rank of subfamily.

Genera
Anomalempis Melander, 1928
Apalocnemis Philippi, 1865
Boreodromia Coquillett, 1903
Brachystoma Meigen, 1822
Ceratempis Melander, 1927
Ceratomerus Philippi, 1865
Ephydrempis Saigusa, 1986
Gloma Meigen, 1822
Glyphidopeza Sinclair, 1997
Heleodromia Haliday, 1833
Hyperperacera Collin, 1933
Niphogenia Melander, 1928
Pseudheleodromia Wagner, 2001
Rubistella Garrett-Jones, 1940
Sabroskyella Wilder, 1982
Sematopoda Collin, 1928
Sinotrichopeza Yang, Zhang & Zhang, 2007
Trichopeza Rondani, 1856
Xanthodromia Saigusa, 1986
Zealandicesa Koçak & Kemal, 2010

References

Further reading

 
 

Empidoidea
Brachycera subfamilies